Gustave Choquet (1 March 1915 – 14 November 2006) was a French mathematician.

Choquet was born in Solesmes, Nord. His contributions include work in functional analysis, potential theory, topology and measure theory. He is known for creating the Choquet theory, the Choquet integral and the theory of capacities.

He did postgraduate work at the École Normale Supérieure Paris where his advisor was Arnaud Denjoy. He was Professor at the University of Paris (subsequently Paris VI) from 1940 to 1984 and was also Professor at the École Polytechnique from 1960 to 1969. His honours and awards included being a Member of the Académie des Sciences, and an Officier of the Légion d’Honneur.

His students include Haïm Brezis, Gilles Godefroy, Nassif Ghoussoub, Michel L. Lapidus, and Michel Talagrand.

He was married to mathematician and mathematical physicist Yvonne Choquet-Bruhat, with whom he had a son Daniel and a daughter Geneviève. He died in Lyon in 2006.

Bibliography 
, available from Gallica. It is an historical account on the development of the theory of capacities by the founder of the theory and one of the main contributors; an English translation of the title reads as: "The birth of capacity theory: reflections on a personal experience".
 Choquet, Gustave (1969), Lectures on Analysis, 3 Vols., W.A. Benjamin, Inc., New York.

See also 
Capacity of a set
Choquet game
Choquet integral
Choquet theory
Radó–Kneser–Choquet theorem

External links 
A biography (in French) by the Académie des Sciences.
A short biography (in French).
A commemorative section (396kb PDF) of the N° 111 Gazette des Mathématiciens (2007) of the Société Mathématique de France.
 

1915 births
2006 deaths
People from Nord (French department)
20th-century French mathematicians
Academic staff of the University of Paris
École Normale Supérieure alumni
Members of the French Academy of Sciences
Officiers of the Légion d'honneur